Mount Clarke is a mountain in southwestern British Columbia, Canada, located  northwest of Hemlock Valley and  south of Grainger Peak. It is part of the Douglas Ranges, the southernmost subdivision of the Pacific Ranges which in turn form part of the Coast Mountains.

The northwest ridge of Mount Clarke contains the sub-peaks Viennese and Recourse, which are considered separate peaks.

References

Two-thousanders of British Columbia
Douglas Ranges
New Westminster Land District